Various types of stress dysregulation are described in articles on:

 Adrenal insufficiency
 Emotional dysregulation
 Epigenetics of anxiety and stress–related disorders
 Transgenerational stress inheritance